Havets Vargar is the second studio album released by Viking metal band Månegarm. It was released in 2000. "Havets vargar" means "wolves of the sea" in Swedish, which is another name for pirates.

Track listing

External links
 Månegarm's official website

 

Månegarm albums
2000 albums